Mullah Abdur Razzaq Akhundzada (born 1958), an ethnic Pashtun, is a former interior minister in the Afghan government who is believed to be a member of the Taliban leadership. He is rumoured to belong to the Achakzai tribe, from a family of Jalaludin village, Spin Boldak District, Kandahar Province; it is also claimed that he is in fact not an Afghan, but is a Pakistani national.

Razzaq traveled to Pakistan in mid-May 2000 to discuss the extradition of criminals, terrorism, drug trafficking and the Afghanistan–Pakistan Transit Trade Agreement. Pakistan demanded the closure of 18 Afghan training camps, where Pakistani militants were believed to be receiving training.

The British paper The Scotsman reported that Razzaq was a founding member of the Taliban; that he headed the Taliban's customs department; and was later interior minister.
The May 11, 2003 article said that Razzaq was the number two in 
a then new Taliban military command structure.

References

Living people
Taliban founders
Taliban government ministers of Afghanistan
Pashtun people
1958 births
Afghan emigrants to Pakistan